The Timid EP is an EP by indie rock band the Like Young.  Their first release for The Polyvinyl Record Company, it was released in 2005.

Track listing
 I've Been Used
 Tempt Me
 Don't Get Dead

References

2005 EPs
The Like Young EPs
Polyvinyl Record Co. EPs